Bujumbura Mairie Province is one of the eighteen provinces of Burundi. It consists entirely of the city of Bujumbura, Burundi's former capital.

History
It was created by splitting Bujumbura Province into Bujumbura Mairie Province and Bujumbura Rural Province.

Administrative subdivisions
The city of Bujumbura is divided into three communes (as of 2014), which are sub-divided into 13 neighborhoods (per Ministerial Order No. 530/1279 of 22 September 2005), which are further sub-divided into quarters

 Commune of Muha
 Kanyosha
 Quarters: Gisyo-Nyabaranda, Musama, Nyabugete, Kizingwe-Bihara, Nkega-Busoro, Ruziba, Kajiji
 Kinindo
 Quarters: Kibenga, Kinanira I, Kinanira II, Kinanira III, Kinindo, Zeimet-OUA
 
 Quarters: Gasekebuye-Gikoto, Gitaramuka, Kamesa, Kinanira I, Kinanira II
 Commune of Mukaza
 Buyenzi
 Quarters: I, II, III, IV, V, VI, VII
 
 Quarters: Bwiza I, Bwiza II, Bwiza III, Bwiza IV, Kwijabe I, Kwijabe II, Kwijabe III
 
 Quarters: Kigwati, Nyakabiga I, Nyakabiga II, Nyakabiga III
 
 Quarters: Centre Ville, Rohero I - Gatoke, Kabondo, Mutanga-Sud - Sororezo, Asiatique, I.N.S.S, Rohero II, Kiriri-Vugizo
 Commune of Ntahangwa
 Buterere
 Quarters: Buterere I, Buterere II A, Buterere II B, Kabusa, Kiyange, Maramvya, Mubone, Mugaruro, Kiyange
 
 Quarters: I, II, III, IV, V, VI, VII
 Gihosha
 Quarters: Gasenyi, Gihosha, Gikungu, Kigobe, Mutanga-Nord, Muyaga, Nyabagere, Taba, Winterekwa
 
 Quarters: Gikizi, Gituro, Heha, Kavumu, Mirango I, Mirango II, Songa, Teza, Twinyoni
 Kigobe
 Quarters: Kigobe Nord, Kigobe Sud
 Kinama
 Quarters: Bubanza, Buhinyuza, Bukirasazi I, Bukirasazi II, Bururi, Carama, Gitega, Kanga, Muramvya, Muyinga, Ngozi, Ruyigi, SOCARTI.
 
 Quarters: I, II, III, IV, V, VI, VII, VIII, IX, Industriel

References

External links
 Map of Bujumbura in 2009, showing 13 communes

Provinces of Burundi
Mairie Province
Mairie